A freeway lid (also known as a lidded freeway, freeway cap, highway cap or highway deck) is a type of deck bridge built on top of a controlled-access highway or other roadway. It is commonly used to create new parkland in urban areas, but can also be used to house buildings or other heavy structures like convention centers. In some locations, the terms stitch or cap-and-stitch are used to describe overpasses containing widened bridges that accommodate wider sidewalks or small amenity space beside the roadway above the highway.

Cities and highway departments who propose building freeway lids over highways often cite potential benefits including reconnecting street grids near highways, or providing increased access to neighborhoods harmed by displacement caused by past highway construction. Freeway lids are often criticized by highway expansion opponents, who accuse highway departments of using freeway lids to "greenwash" their lane expansion projects to be more palatable to the public.

Examples

Aubrey Davis Park, Mercer Island, Washington, US
George Washington Bridge Bus Station and the Bridge Apartments, New York, New York
Kansas City Convention Center, Kansas City, Missouri, US
Klyde Warren Park, Dallas, Texas, US
Teralta Park, San Diego, California, US
Washington State Convention Center and Freeway Park, Seattle, Washington, US

References

Buildings and structures by type